Julio Martínez Prádanos (Temuco, Chile, June 23, 1923 – Santiago, Chile, January 2, 2008) was a Chilean sports commentator specializing in football who had a long career in the written press, radio and television. He won the 1995 National Prize for Journalism, awarded by the Chilean Ministry of Education. He belongs to a generation of ever-lasting emblematic Chilean sports commentators, along with Sergio Livingstone, Pedro Carcuro, Alberto Fouillioux, Néstor Isella and Milton Millas.

Martínez died of terminal prostate cancer on January 2, 2008, after years of failing health.

Tributes

Living
1982: The football club Julio Martínez was established in Rancagua.
1987: In the remodeling of the Estadio Santa Laura in Santiago, the press gallery is named after the journalist.
2005: A gym in the commune of Cerro Navia in Santiago is named after the commentator.

Posthumous
January 4, 2008:
The calle Santa Laura in Santiago is renamed calle Julio Martínez Prádanos by decision of the Municipalidad of Independencia.
The Government of Chile proposed that the Estadio Nacional de Chile be renamed the Estadio Nacional Julio Martínez Prádanos. The calle Santa Laura was also renamed after him.

References

External links

1923 births
2008 deaths
Chilean journalists
Chilean association football commentators
Canal 13 Chile play-by-play commentators
Male journalists
Chilean people of Spanish descent
People from Temuco
Deaths from prostate cancer
Deaths from cancer in Chile
20th-century journalists